is a Japanese computer scientist and one of the world's foremost researchers in computer vision. He is U.A. and Helen Whitaker Professor at Carnegie Mellon University. He has approximately 300 peer-reviewed academic publications and holds around 20 patents.

Honors and achievements
 In 1997, he was elected to the US National Academy of Engineering for contributions to computer vision and robotics. 
 In 1997, he was elected to the American Academy of Arts and Sciences
 In 1999 he was inducted as a Fellow of the Association for Computing Machinery.
 In 2008 Kanade received the Bower Award and Prize for Achievement in Science from The Franklin Institute in Philadelphia, Pennsylvania.
 A special event called TK60: Celebrating Takeo Kanade's vision was held to commemorate his 60th birthday. This event was attended by prominent computer vision researchers.
 Elected member of American Association of Artificial Intelligence, Robotics Society of Japan, and Institute of Electronics and Communication Engineers of Japan
 Marr Prize, 1990 for the paper Shape from Interreflections which he co-authored with Shree K. Nayar and Katsushi Ikeuchi
 Longuet-Higgins Prize for lasting contribution in computer vision at
 CVPR 2006 for the paper "Neural Network-Based Face Detection" coauthored with H. Rowley and S. Baluja
 CVPR 2008 for the paper "Probabilistic modeling of local appearance and spatial relationships for object recognition" coauthored with H Schneiderman
 The other awards he has received include the C&C Award, the Joseph Engelberger Award, FIT Funai Accomplishment Award, the Allen Newell Research Excellence Award, and the JARA Award.
 He has served for many government, industrial, and university advisory boards, including the Aeronautics and Space Engineering Board (ASEB) of the National Research Council, NASA's Advanced Technology Advisory Committee, PITAC Panel for Transforming Healthcare Panel, and the Advisory Board of Canadian Institute for Advanced Research.
 In 2016 Kanade received the Kyoto Prize in Information Sciences.

Notable works
 Lucas–Kanade method
 One of the earliest face detectors
 Tomasi–Kanade factorization method 
 Virtualized Reality
 Multi-baseline stereo and the world's first full-image video-rate stereo machine 
 VLSI computational sensors
 Shape recovery from line drawings (known as Origami World theory and skew symmetry)

External links
Takeo's Home Page at the Robotics Institute, CMU.
Envisioning Robotics Online Archival Exhibit
Think like an amateur, do as an expert 2016 Kyoto Prize Public Lecture

References

Living people
Japanese computer scientists
Fellows of the Association for Computing Machinery
Fellows of the Association for the Advancement of Artificial Intelligence
Japanese roboticists
1945 births
Computer vision researchers
Kyoto University alumni
Persons of Cultural Merit
Kyoto laureates in Advanced Technology